V.I.P. is a 2017 South Korean crime-action thriller film directed by Park Hoon-jung and starring Jang Dong-gun, Kim Myung-min, Park Hee-soon and Lee Jong-suk. In the film, officers from South Korea, North Korea and Interpol chase after a serial killer suspect.

The film was released on August 23, 2017. The reception was largely negative, with criticism directed mainly towards the portrayal of graphic violence towards a female character. The film was later released on DVD and Blu-ray formats on 7 March 2018.

Plot 
The son of a high-ranking North Korean official, Kwang-il (Lee Jong-suk), is suspected of committing serial rapes and murders of women around the world. To stop the killer, South Korea, North Korea and Interpol chase after him.

Cast

Main 
 Jang Dong-gun as Park Jae-hyuk: An agent working for the South Korean National Intelligence Service(NIS).
 Kim Myung-min as Chae Yi-do: A Police Detective Chief Inspector who leads a serial murder case and who fights hard to bring a criminal to justice.
 Lee Jong-suk as Kim Kwang-il: A key North Korean political figure's son who receives VIP treatment after his defection to South Korea, organised by the United States Central Intelligence Agency (CIA). He becomes a prime suspect for a serial murder case.
 Park Hee-soon as Ri Dae-bum: A North Korean police officer who secretly crosses the border into the South to track down Kim Kwang-il.

Supporting 
 Peter Stormare as Paul Gray: A CIA agent.
 Lee Jung-hyuk as Gwang Il's gang member
 Oh Dae-hwan
 Tae In-ho as agent Tae.
 Yoo Jae-myung
 Park Sung-woong
 Jo Woo-jin as Prosecutor.

Production 
Filming began on October 22, 2016 and ended on January 22, 2017. Filming took place in South Korea, Hong Kong, Thailand and other countries.

Release 
The cast of V.I.P was invited to the 74th Venice International Film Festival which began on August 30, 2017. However, the invitation was declined by the production company as the film's release could not be rescheduled to a later date.

The film was released in South Korean cinemas on August 23, 2017.

Reception

Critical response
V.I.P was named as an R-rated crime film, which restricted audiences younger than eighteen years of age.
 
Many viewers criticized the film's depiction of violence against women. Some of the comments were regarding the film's unnecessary cruel and gruesome scenes, while others critiqued the use of female characters as devices of sexual violence to show the cruelty of male characters.

Box office
Upon its release in South Korean cinemas on August 23, 2017, V.I.P. hit the top spot, selling 174,022 ticket and earning a gross income of US$1.17 million on its opening day. During the first two days V.I.P sold 341,610 tickets earning US$2.3 million. After five days of its release the movie has attracted 940,359 audience screening in 966 venues.

According to the Korean Film Council V.I.P had surpassed 1 million viewers by August 29, in just seven days since its release, and the film earned a total gross income of US$7.8 million.

Awards and nominations

References

External links 

Warner Bros. films
2010s Korean-language films
2017 crime action films
South Korean action thriller films
South Korean crime action films
South Korean crime thriller films
South Korean serial killer films
2010s serial killer films
2017 films
2017 action thriller films
2017 crime thriller films
Films directed by Park Hoon-jung
2010s South Korean films